The women's 1500 metres in speed skating at the 1972 Winter Olympics took place on February 9, at the Makomanai Open Stadium.

Records
Prior to this competition, the existing world and Olympic records were as follows:

The following new World and Olympic records was set during the competition.

Results

References

Women's speed skating at the 1972 Winter Olympics
Olymp
Skat